The Rockpile Mountain Wilderness is a wilderness area in the U.S. state of Missouri in Mark Twain National Forest. It takes its name from an ancient circle of granite rock, piled by some earlier man on top of the mountain. The namesake rock pile most likely was an Indian cairn. It is located in Madison County, Missouri, southeast of Bell Mountain and southwest of Fredericktown, Missouri. The area is primarily a broken ridge, having steep rocky slopes running from Little Grass Mountain on the north to the National Forest boundary four miles to the south.

See also
Bell Mountain Wilderness
Devils Backbone Wilderness
Hercules-Glades Wilderness
Irish Wilderness
Paddy Creek Wilderness
Piney Creek Wilderness

References

IUCN Category Ib
Protected areas established in 1980
Protected areas of Madison County, Missouri
Wilderness areas of Missouri
Mark Twain National Forest